

Belgium
Belgian Congo – Auguste Tilkens, Governor-General of the Belgian Congo (1927–1934)

France
 French Somaliland – Louis Placide Blacher, Governor of French Somaliland (1932–1934)
 Guinea – 
 Joseph Vadier, Lieutenant-Governor of Guinea (1932–1933)
 Antoine Paladi, acting Lieutenant-Governor of Guinea (1933)
 Joseph Vadier, Lieutenant-Governor of Guinea (1933–1935)

Japan
 Karafuto – Takeshi Imamura, Governor-General of Karafuto (5 July 1932 – 7 May 1938)
 Korea – Kazushige Ugaki, Governor-General of Korea (1931–1936)
 Taiwan – Kenzō Nakagawa, Governor-General of Taiwan (27 May 1932 – September 1936)

Portugal
 Angola – Eduardo Ferreira Viana, High Commissioner of Angola (1931–1934)

United Kingdom
 India – Freeman Freeman-Thomas, 1st Marquess of Willingdon, Viceroy of India (1931–1936)
 Malta Colony – David Campbell, Governor of Malta (1931–1936)
 Northern Rhodesia – Sir Ronald Storrs, Governor of Northern Rhodesia (1932–1935)

Colonial governors
Colonial governors
1933